O-2694 is a drug that is a cannabinoid derivative. It has analgesic effects and is used in scientific research. Unlike most cannabinoids discovered to date, it is highly water-soluble, which gives it considerable advantages over many related drugs. It has high affinity for both CB1 and CB2 receptors, with Ki values of 3.7 nM at CB1 and 2.8 nM at CB2. However, it has complex pharmacokinetics as most of the administered dose is metabolised by hydrolysis of the ester link to the water-insoluble compound O-2372, thus producing a biphasic effects profile that is less suitable for research purposes than the related compound O-2545.

See also 
 O-1057
 O-2372

References 

Cannabinoids
Benzochromenes
Carboxylate esters
4-Morpholinyl compunds
Carboxamides
Diisopropylamino compounds